Bronowski is a surname. Notable people with the surname include:

Alfred Bronowski, a pen name of Alfred Szklarski, an author of youth literature
Jacob Bronowski (1908–1974), Polish-British mathematician, biologist, and historian of science
Lisa Jardine (née Bronowski) (1944–2015), British historian

See also
Bronów (disambiguation)
Bronowo (disambiguation)
Bronowice (disambiguation)

Polish-language surnames